"Fuckin with My Head (Mountain Dew Rock)" is a song by the alternative rock musician Beck. It is the third song on his 1994 first album, Mellow Gold.

Background
The song has many guitars and sounds that are layered together. Due to this, several sounds and influences are evident, including heavy metal, acoustic, psychedelic, funk, folk, boogie and rock.

Live performances
The song has been performed live 60 times by Beck and was regularly played by him in 1994 but has not been performed live since December 2, 2007, when Beck was the opener for The Police.

Critical reception
Stephen Thomas Erlewine of AllMusic wrote in a review for the album that the song was "garagery". The website udiscovermusic called the song one of the album's highlights. Stereogum wrote that the song had a lot of "forward momentum".

References

External links

1994 songs
Beck songs